Election Day in the United States is the annual day for general elections of federal public officials. It is statutorily set by the U.S. government as "the Tuesday next after the first Monday in November", i.e. the Tuesday that occurs within November 2 to November 8.

For federal offices (president, vice president, and United States Congress) and most gubernatorial offices (all except for Kentucky, Louisiana, Mississippi, New Jersey, and Virginia), Election Day occurs only in even-numbered years. Presidential elections are held every four years, in years divisible by four, in which electors for president and vice president are chosen according to the method determined by each state. Elections to the US House of Representatives and the US Senate are held every two years; all representatives are elected to serve two-year terms and are up for election every two years, while senators serve six-year terms, staggered so that one third of senators are elected in any given general election. General elections in which presidential candidates are not on the ballot are referred to as midterm elections. Terms for those elected begin in January the following year; the president and vice president are inaugurated (sworn in) on Inauguration Day, which is usually January 20.

Many state and local government offices are also elected on Election Day as a matter of convenience and cost saving, although a handful of states hold elections for state offices (such as governor) during odd-numbered off years, or during other even-numbered midterm years, and may hold special elections for offices that have become vacant. Congress has mandated a uniform date for presidential and congressional ( and ) elections, though early voting is nonetheless authorized in many states, and states also have mail voting procedures.

The fact that Election Day falls on a Tuesday has become controversial in recent decades, as many people might be unable to vote because they have to work. It is a public holiday in some states, including Delaware, Hawaii, Illinois, Kentucky, Louisiana, Montana, New Jersey, New York, Virginia, West Virginia, as well as the territory of the Northern Mariana Islands and Puerto Rico. Some other states require that workers be permitted to take time off with pay. California requires that employees otherwise unable to vote must be allowed two hours off with pay, at the beginning or end of a shift. A federal holiday called Democracy Day, to coincide with Election Day, has been proposed, and some have proposed moving election day to the weekend. Other movements in the IT and automotive industries encourage employers to voluntarily give their employees paid time off on Election Day.

History
By 1792, federal law permitted each state legislature to choose Presidential electors any time within a 34-day period before the first Wednesday in December. A November election was convenient because the harvest would have been completed but the most severe winter weather, impeding transportation, would not yet have arrived, while the new election results also would roughly conform to a new year. Tuesday was chosen as Election Day so that voters could attend church on Sunday, travel to the polling location (usually in the county seat) on Monday, and vote before Wednesday, which was usually when farmers would sell their produce at the market. Originally, states varied considerably in the method of choosing electors. Gradually, states converged on selection by some form of popular vote.

Development of the Morse electric telegraph, funded by Congress in 1843 and successfully tested in 1844, was a technological change that clearly augured an imminent future of instant communication nationwide. To prevent information from one state from influencing Presidential electoral outcomes in another, Congress responded in 1845 by mandating a uniform national date for choosing Presidential electors. Congress chose the first Tuesday after the first Monday in November to harmonize current electoral practice with the existing 34-day window in federal law, as the span between Election Day and the first Wednesday in December is always 29 days. The effect is to constrain Election Day to the week between November 2 and 8 inclusive. Beginning with Presidential elections, states gradually brought most elections into conformity with this date.

The Twentieth Amendment, passed in 1933, changed the beginning and end date for the terms of the President, Vice President, Congressmen, and Senators. It did not affect the timing of Election Day.

Scheduling issues
The majority of the electorate have to attend work on Tuesdays. This has led activists to promote alternatives to increase voter turnout. Alternative solutions include making Election Day a federal holiday or merging it with Veterans Day, observed annually on November 11, allowing voting over multiple days, mandating paid time off to vote, encouraging voters to vote early or vote by postal voting, and encouraging states to promote flexible voting.

Holiday and paid leave

Delaware, Hawaii, Illinois, Kentucky, Louisiana, Montana, New Jersey, New York, Ohio, Virginia, West Virginia, and the territory of Puerto Rico have declared Election Day a civic holiday. Some other states require that workers be permitted to take time off from employment without loss of pay. California Elections Code Section 14000 and New York State Election Law provide that employees without sufficient time to vote must be allowed two hours off with pay, at the beginning or end of a shift.

Some employers allow their employees to begin later or leave their workplace early on Election Day to allow them the opportunity to get to their precinct and vote. The United Auto Workers union has negotiated making Election Day a holiday for workers of U.S. domestic auto manufacturers. In January 2019, Sandusky, Ohio became the first city in the country to make Election Day a paid holiday for city employees by eliminating Columbus Day.

On April 12, 2020, the Governor of Virginia Ralph Northam signed legislation that established Election Day as a holiday. On June 16, 2020, the Governor of Illinois J.B. Pritzker signed legislation that established Election Day as a holiday.

Democratic Representative John Conyers of Michigan proposed H.R. 63 – Democracy Day Act of 2005 for the Tuesday after the first Monday in November of every even-numbered year, to be a legal public holiday called Democracy Day. The purpose of the holiday was to increase voter turnout by giving citizens more time to vote, as well as to allow for the opening of more polling stations with more workers while raising awareness of the importance of voting and civic participation. The bill was reintroduced on November 12, 2014, and again on September 25, 2018, by independent Senator Bernie Sanders. It has never been enacted.

Early and postal voting
Most states allow early voting, letting voters cast their ballots before Election Day. Early voting periods vary from 4 to 50 days prior to Election Day. Unconditional early voting in person is allowed in 32 states and in D.C. In the 2008 presidential election, 30% of votes were early votes.

Also, all states have some kind of absentee ballot system. Unconditional absentee voting by mail is allowed in 27 states and D.C., and with an excuse in another 21 states. Unconditional permanent absentee voting is allowed in 7 states and in D.C. In Colorado, Oregon, Washington, Utah, and Hawaii all major elections are by postal voting, with ballot papers sent to voters several weeks before Election Day.

In 29 states, postal votes must be received on or before Election Day. Other states have later deadlines, with California election law allowing mailed in ballots to arrive at the elections office up to 17 days after Election Day. Some states, like Texas, give overseas and military voters extra time to mail in their ballots.

Election Day on weekends
Louisiana, to date, is the only U.S. state to hold de facto general elections on a Saturday, as the state's statewide elections are held on odd years and the state's unique primary method, a variation of the nonpartisan blanket primary, only requires a further runoff to be held on the federal Election Day (Tuesday) for those offices for which neither of the top two candidates receive an absolute majority of the vote.

See also
Fixed-term election
Primary election
Public holidays in the United States
Special election
U.S. state holiday

References

External links
 

Elections in the United States
November observances
State holidays in the United States
Tuesday observances